Scaptocoris is a genus of burrowing bugs in the family Cydnidae. There are at least four described species in Scaptocoris.

Species
These four species belong to the genus Scaptocoris:
 Scaptocoris buckupi Becker g
 Scaptocoris carvalhoi Becker g
 Scaptocoris castaneus Perty, 1833 i c g b
 Scaptocoris talpa Champion g
Data sources: i = ITIS, c = Catalogue of Life, g = GBIF, b = Bugguide.net

References

Further reading

 
 
 
 
 
 
 

Cydnidae